The Phalangodoidea are a superfamily of the harvestman infraorder Grassatores with three recognized families and 220 species. It is not to be confused with the similarly spelled subfamily Phalangioidea, which is also a harvestman superfamily, but within the suborder Eupnoi.

Families
 Oncopodidae Thorell, 1876 (about 70 species)
 Phalangodidae Simon, 1879 (about 100 species)
 Pyramidopidae Starega (about 50 species)

Harvestmen
Arthropod superfamilies